Philip William Bryce Lever, 3rd Viscount Leverhulme  (1 July 1915 – 4 July 2000) was a British peer and racehorse owner.

Early life
He was the only son of William Lever, 2nd Viscount Leverhulme and his first wife, Marion Beatrice Smith. He was born on 1 July 1915. He was educated at Eton College and Trinity College, Cambridge.

Career
During the Second World War, he served in the Middle East with the Cheshire Yeomanry, and late became an honorary colonel. After the war, he managed his father's estates at Thornton Manor. In 1954, he bought the Badanloch estate, in Sutherland, Scotland.

In 1949, he inherited his father's titles and was appointed Lord Lieutenant of Cheshire that year, a post he held until 1990, making him the longest serving Lord Lieutenant in the country.

His lifelong passion was horse racing, the subject of his 1976 maiden speech in the House of Lords. A racehorse owner, he served as Chairman of Chester Racecourse and as a senior steward of the Jockey Club. He was a supporter of the Animal Health Trust, a veterinary research establishment. He was Chancellor of the University of Liverpool from 1980 to 1993 and appointed a Knight of the Garter in 1988.

Marriage and issue
On 1 July 1937, he married Margaret Ann Moon (died 1973), and they had three daughters:
The Hon. Susan Elizabeth Moon Lever (born 1938), married (Hercules) Michael Pakenham.
The Hon. Victoria Marion Ann Lever (1945-2021), married (1) Sir Richard Pole, 13th Baronet, (2) Gordon Apsion, (3) Peter Tower.
The Hon. (Margaret) Jane Lever (born 1947), married Sir Algernon Heber-Percy.

Succession
He died on 4 July 2000. As Leverhulme was the last male descendant of the 1st Viscount and died without male heirs in 2000, his titles became extinct.

Honours and decorations

See also
Burke's Peerage

References

1915 births
2000 deaths
Knights of the Garter
Lord-Lieutenants of Cheshire
People associated with the University of Liverpool
People educated at Eton College
Viscounts in the Peerage of the United Kingdom
Lever family
Leverhulme